Iniistius evides is a species of marine ray-finned fish from the family Labridae, the wrasses. It is found in the Western Pacific Ocean.  

References

evides
Taxa named by David Starr Jordan 
Taxa named by Robert Earl Richardson
Fish described in 1909